Ederson Salomón Rodríguez Lima (born 16 February 2000) is a Uruguayan footballer who plays as a forward for Godoy Cruz in the Argentine Primera División.

Career

Club career
Rodríguez made his league debut for the club on 16 February 2020, coming on as a 70th minute substitute for Renato César in a 2-0 home victory over Nacional.

On 1 February 2022, Salomón joined Argentine Primera División club Godoy Cruz on a three-year deal.

References

External links

2000 births
Living people
Uruguayan footballers
Uruguayan expatriate footballers
Association football forwards
People from Tacuarembó Department
C.A. Rentistas players
Godoy Cruz Antonio Tomba footballers
Uruguayan Primera División players
Argentine Primera División players
Uruguayan expatriate sportspeople in Argentina
Expatriate footballers in Argentina